Ramón Martínez Vigil (12 September 1840 – 17 August 1904) was a Spanish priest, bishop of Oviedo.

References

External links
Catholic Hierarchy page
La Nueva España's page

1840 births
1904 deaths
Bishops of Oviedo